Martha Grimes (born May 2, 1931) is an American writer of detective fiction. She is best known for a series featuring Richard Jury, a Scotland Yard inspector, and Melrose Plant, an aristocrat turned amateur sleuth.

Biography
Grimes was born in Pittsburgh, Pennsylvania, to William Dermit Grimes, Pittsburgh's city solicitor, and June Dunnington, who owned the Mountain Lake Hotel in Western Maryland, where Martha and her brother spent much of their childhood. Grimes earned her B.A. and M.A. at the University of Maryland and did postgraduate work at the University of Iowa. She has taught at the University of Iowa, Frostburg State University, and Montgomery College (Takoma Park).

In 1983, Grimes received the Nero Wolfe Award for best mystery of the year for The Anodyne Necklace. In 2012, Grimes was named Grand Master by the Edgar Awards Mystery Writers of America.

Grimes initially became known for her series of novels featuring Richard Jury, an inspector with Scotland Yard, and his friend Melrose Plant, a British aristocrat who has given up his titles. Each of the Jury mysteries is named after a pub.

Her Emma Graham quartet of novels beginning with Hotel Paradise is set in an atmospheric aging lake resort in western Maryland, and delves into mysteries of past secrets and human nature. The background of the series draws from the experiences that she enjoyed while spending summers at her mother's hotel in Mountain Lake Park, Maryland. One of the characters, Mr. Britten, is drawn on Britten Leo Martin Sr., who then ran Martin's Store, which he owned with his father and brother. Martin's Store is accessible by a short walkway from the Mountain Lake Hotel, the site of the former hotel, which was torn down in 1967.

The two Andi Oliver novels center on a young drifter with amnesia, making her way in the northern U.S. Midwest armed with a strong sense of right and wrong and great compassion.  Grimes has donated a large portion of her profits from these novels to animal-protection organizations.

Grimes lives in Bethesda, Maryland. She is a vegetarian.

Works

Richard Jury series (with Melrose Plant)
 The Man With a Load of Mischief (Boston: Little, Brown, 1981)
 The Old Fox Deceiv'd (Boston: Little, Brown, 1982)
 The Anodyne Necklace (Boston: Little, Brown, 1983)
 The Dirty Duck (Boston: Little, Brown, 1984)
 Jerusalem Inn (Boston: Little, Brown, 1984)
 Help the Poor Struggler (Boston: Little, Brown, 1985)
 The Deer Leap (Boston: Little, Brown, 1985)
 I Am the Only Running Footman (Boston: Little, Brown, 1986)
 The Five Bells and Bladebone (Boston: Little, Brown, 1987)
 The Old Silent (Boston: Little, Brown, 1989)
 The Old Contemptibles (Boston: Little, Brown, 1991)
 The Horse You Came In On (New York: Alfred A. Knopf, 1993)
 Rainbow's End (New York: Alfred A. Knopf, 1995)
 The Case Has Altered (New York: Alfred A. Knopf, 1997)
 The Stargazey (New York: Holt, 1998)
 The Lamorna Wink (New York: Viking/Penguin, 1999)
 The Blue Last (New York: Viking/Penguin, 2001)
 The Grave Maurice (New York: Viking Penguin, 2002)
 The Winds of Change (New York: Viking/Penguin, 2004)
 The Old Wine Shades (New York: Viking/Penguin, 2006)
 Dust (New York: Viking/Penguin, 2007)
 The Black Cat (New York: Viking/Penguin, 2010)
 Vertigo 42 (New York: Scribner, 2014)
 The Knowledge (New York: Atlantic Monthly Press, 2018)
 The Old Success (New York: Atlantic Monthly Press, 2019)

The Man With a Load of Mischief, Help the Poor Struggler and The Deer Leap were filmed on behalf of the German and Austrian broadcasters ZDF and ORF under the title Der Tote im Pub (The Dead Man in the Pub) (2013), Mord im Nebel (Murder in the Fog) (2015) and Inspektor Jury spielt Katz und Maus (Inspector Jury plays Cat-and-Mouse) (2017). Fritz Karl as Jury, Götz Schubert as Plant and Katharina Thalbach as "Lady" Agatha Ardry.

Andi Oliver series
 Biting the Moon (New York: Holt, 1999)
 Dakota (New York: Viking/Penguin, 2008)

featuring Maud Chadwick (who is also a character in the Emma Graham Series)
 The End of the Pier (Ballantine Books, 1993)

Emma Graham series
 Hotel Paradise (Knopf, 1996)
 Cold Flat Junction (2000)
 Belle Ruin (2005)
 Fadeaway Girl (2011)

Novels, Short Stories & Poetry
 Send Bygraves (Putnam, 1990)
 The Train Now Departing (New York: Viking/Penguin, 2001)
 Foul Matter (New York: Viking/Penguin, 2003)
 The Way of All Fish (Simon and Schuster, 2014)

Memoirs
 Double Double: A Memoir of Alcoholism with Ken Grimes (Scribner, 2016)

References

Source: Contemporary Authors Online, Thomson Gale, 2006.

External links
Martha Grimes' official Web site

Ryan, Ellen. "Martha Grimes: Woman of Mystery", Washingtonian, August 1, 2008.

20th-century American novelists
21st-century American novelists
American mystery writers
American women novelists
Writers from Pittsburgh
Living people
1931 births
University of Maryland, College Park alumni
Nero Award winners
Edgar Award winners
University of Iowa faculty
Frostburg State University faculty
Women mystery writers
20th-century American women writers
21st-century American women writers
Novelists from Pennsylvania
Novelists from Iowa
American women academics